The nuclear option is a political tactic used in the United States Senate.

Nuclear option may also refer to:
Nuclear warfare
Nuclear weapon
Strategic nuclear weapon
Tactical nuclear weapon
A hyperbole by analogy to nuclear weapons, referring to the most extreme amongst a range of options
Article 7 of the Treaty on European Union, a political tactic, is sometimes called the nuclear option

See also
Nuclear strategy
Nuclear power 
Mutual assured destruction
Intercontinental ballistic missile
Nuclear triad
Filibuster in the United States Senate
Standing Rules of the United States Senate, Rule XXII
Cloture#United States
Article 49 of the French Constitution, Clause 3